Eupithecia kuni is a moth in the family Geometridae that is endemic to Vietnam.

References

External links

Moths described in 2009
Endemic fauna of Vietnam
Moths of Asia
kuni